Brachyglossina is a genus of moths in the family Geometridae.

Species
 Brachyglossina chaspia Brandt, 1938
 Brachyglossina hispanaria

References
 Brachyglossina at Markku Savela's Lepidoptera and Some Other Life Forms
Natural History Museum Lepidoptera genus database

Sterrhini